The following outline is provided as an overview of and topical guide to United States federal Indian law and policy:

Federal Indian policy – establishes the relationship between the United States Government and the Indian Tribes within its borders. The Constitution gives the federal government primary responsibility for dealing with tribes. Law and U.S. public policy related to Native Americans have evolved continuously since the founding of the United States. David R. Wrone argues that the failure of the treaty system was because of the inability of an individualistic, democratic society to recognize group rights or the value of an organic, corporatist culture represented by the tribes.

U.S. Supreme Court cases

List of United States Supreme Court cases involving Indian tribes

Citizenship

Adoption
Mississippi Band of Choctaw Indians v. Holyfield, 
Adoptive Couple v. Baby Girl,

Tribal
Ex parte Joins, 
Santa Clara Pueblo v. Martinez, 
Mississippi Band of Choctaw Indians v. Holyfield, 
South Dakota v. Bourland,

Civil rights
Oliphant v. Suquamish Indian Tribe, 
United States v. Wheeler,

Congressional authority
Ex parte Joins, 
White Mountain Apache Tribe v. Bracker, 
California v. Cabazon Band of Mission Indians, 
South Dakota v. Bourland, 
United States v. Lara,

Gambling
California v. Cabazon Band of Mission Indians,

Hunting and fishing rights
Menominee Tribe v. United States, 
New Mexico v. Mescalero Apache Tribe, 
Oregon Dept. of Fish and Wildlife v. Klamath Indian Tribe, 
Brendale v. Confederated Yakima Indian Nation, 
South Dakota v. Bourland,

Jurisdiction
Iowa Mutual Insurance Co. v. LaPlante, 
California v. Cabazon Band of Mission Indians, 
Mississippi Band of Choctaw Indians v. Holyfield, 
South Dakota v. Bourland, 
Adoptive Couple v. Baby Girl,

Criminal
Ex parte Crow Dog, 
United States v. Wheeler, 
Duro v. Reina, 
United States v. Lara,

Federal
United States v. Rogers, 
Ex parte Crow Dog, 
National Farmers Union Ins. Cos. v. Crow Tribe, 
United States v. Lara,

Over non-Indians
Oliphant v. Suquamish Indian Tribe, 
New Mexico v. Mescalero Apache Tribe, 
National Farmers Union Ins. Cos. v. Crow Tribe, 
Iowa Mutual Insurance Co. v. LaPlante, 
California v. Cabazon Band of Mission Indians, 
Duro v. Reina, 
Plains Commerce Bank v. Long Family Land and Cattle Co., Inc., ___ U.S. ___, 128 S.Ct. 2709 (2008)

State
Washington v. Confederated Bands and Tribes of the Yakima Indian Nation, 
White Mountain Apache Tribe v. Bracker, 
Rice v. Rehner, 
Three Affiliated Tribes of Fort Berthold Reservation v. Wold Engineering, P. C., 
Iowa Mutual Insurance Co. v. LaPlante, 
California v. Cabazon Band of Mission Indians,

Liquor
Rice v. Rehner,

Property rights
Oklahoma Tax Commission v. United States, 
United States v. Southern Ute Tribe or Band of Indians, 
United States v. Sioux Nation of Indians, 
Rice v. Rehner, 
Brendale v. Confederated Yakima Indian Nation, 
Oklahoma Tax Comm'n v. Citizen Band of Potawatomi Tribe of Okla., 
Yakima v. Confederated Tribes, 
South Dakota v. Bourland, 
Plains Commerce Bank v. Long Family Land and Cattle Co., Inc., ___ U.S. ___, 128 S.Ct. 2709 (2008)

Allotment
Arenas v. United States, 
Brendale v. Confederated Yakima Indian Nation, 
Yakima v. Confederated Tribes, 
Plains Commerce Bank v. Long Family Land and Cattle Co., Inc., ___ U.S. ___, 128 S.Ct. 2709 (2008)
United States v. Mitchell (1983),

Mineral rights
Merrion v. Jicarilla Apache Tribe,

Reservations
United States v. Southern Ute Tribe or Band of Indians, 
McClanahan v. Arizona State Tax Comm'n, 
Oliphant v. Suquamish Indian Tribe, 
Washington v. Confederated Bands and Tribes of the Yakima Indian Nation, 
Washington v. Confederated Tribes of Colville Reservation, 
White Mountain Apache Tribe v. Bracker, 
United States v. Sioux Nation of Indians, 
Merrion v. Jicarilla Apache Tribe, 
New Mexico v. Mescalero Apache Tribe, 
Rice v. Rehner, 
Oregon Dept. of Fish and Wildlife v. Klamath Indian Tribe, 
California v. Cabazon Band of Mission Indians, 
Mississippi Band of Choctaw Indians v. Holyfield, 
Brendale v. Confederated Yakima Indian Nation, 
Oklahoma Tax Comm'n v. Citizen Band of Potawatomi Tribe of Okla., 
South Dakota v. Bourland, 
Plains Commerce Bank v. Long Family Land and Cattle Co., Inc., ___ U.S. ___, 128 S.Ct. 2709 (2008)

Statutory and treaty interpretation
Ex parte Crow Dog, 
Menominee Tribe v. United States, 
Bryan v. Itasca County, 
Washington v. Confederated Bands and Tribes of the Yakima Indian Nation, 
Oregon Dept. of Fish and Wildlife v. Klamath Indian Tribe, 
South Dakota v. Bourland,

Taxation

State
Oklahoma Tax Commission v. United States, 
Mescalero Apache Tribe v. Jones, 
McClanahan v. Arizona State Tax Comm'n, 
Bryan v. Itasca County, 
Washington v. Confederated Tribes of Colville Reservation, 
White Mountain Apache Tribe v. Bracker, 
Ramah Navajo School Bd., Inc. v. Bureau of Revenue of N.M., 
New Mexico v. Mescalero Apache Tribe, 
Cotton Petroleum Corp. v. New Mexico, 
Oklahoma Tax Comm'n v. Citizen Band of Potawatomi Tribe of Okla., 
Yakima v. Confederated Tribes, 
Oklahoma Tax Commission v. Sac & Fox Nation, 
Dept. of Taxation and Finance of N.Y. v. Milhelm Attea & Bros., Inc., 
Wagnon v. Prairie Band Potawatomi Indians,

Tribal
Merrion v. Jicarilla Apache Tribe,

Tribal sovereignty
Cherokee Nation v. Georgia, 
Worcester v. Georgia, 
United States v. Kagama, 
Oklahoma Tax Commission v. United States, 
Menominee Tribe v. United States, 
Morton v. Mancari, 417 U.S. 535 (1974)
Bryan v. Itasca County, 
Oliphant v. Suquamish Indian Tribe, 
United States v. Wheeler, 
Santa Clara Pueblo v. Martinez, 
Washington v. Confederated Bands and Tribes of the Yakima Indian Nation, 
Washington v. Confederated Tribes of Colville Reservation, 
White Mountain Apache Tribe v. Bracker, 
Merrion v. Jicarilla Apache Tribe, 
Ramah Navajo School Bd., Inc. v. Bureau of Revenue of N.M., 
New Mexico v. Mescalero Apache Tribe, 
National Farmers Union Ins. Cos. v. Crow Tribe, 
Three Affiliated Tribes of Fort Berthold Reservation v. Wold Engineering, P. C., 
Cotton Petroleum Corp. v. New Mexico, 
Brendale v. Confederated Yakima Indian Nation, 
Duro v. Reina, 
Oklahoma Tax Comm'n v. Citizen Band of Potawatomi Tribe of Okla., 
Yakima v. Confederated Tribes, 
Dept. of Taxation and Finance of N.Y. v. Milhelm Attea & Bros., Inc., 
United States v. Lara, 541 U.S. 193 (2004)
Wagnon v. Prairie Band Potawatomi Indians, 
Plains Commerce Bank v. Long Family Land and Cattle Co., Inc., ___ U.S. ___, 128 S.Ct. 2709 (2008)

Other federal court cases
 In the Matter of S--- (1942)
 Sohappy v. Smith (1969)
 Joint Tribal Council of the Passamaquoddy Tribe v. Morton (1975)
 Cobell v. Salazar (1996, 2009)
 Harjo et al v. Pro Football, Inc. (2005)

Legislation

 Alaska Native Allotment Act
 Alaska Native Claims Settlement Act
 Aleut Restitution Act of 1988
 American Indian Religious Freedom Act
 American Indian Trust Fund Management Reform Act 1994
 Burke Act
 Indian Citizenship Act of 1924
 Civilization Fund Act
 Curtis Act of 1898
 Dawes Act
 Indian Gaming Regulatory Act
 Native American Graves Protection and Repatriation Act
 Hawaiian Homelands
 House concurrent resolution 108
 Indian Arts and Crafts Act of 1990
 Indian Child Welfare Act
 Indian Claims Limitations Act
 Indian Land Claims Settlements
 Indian Land Consolidation Act
 Indian Relocation Act of 1956
 Indian Removal Act
 Indian Reorganization Act
 Indian Self-Determination and Education Assistance Act of 1975
 The Indian Vaccination Act of 1832
 Native American Languages Act of 1990
 Nonintercourse Act
 Johnson–O'Malley Act
 Lacey Act of 1907
 Major Crimes Act
 Menominee Restoration Act
 Meriam Report
 Mission Indian Act of 1891
 Native American Housing Assistance and Self-Determination Act of 1996
 Nelson Act of 1889
 Oklahoma Indian Welfare Act
 Public Law 280
 Title 25 of the United States Code
 Tribal Law and Order Act of 2010
 Western Shoshone Claims Distribution Act of 2004
 White Mountain Apache Tribe Water Rights Quantification Act of 2009

Executive Orders
 Executive Order 13007, 1996, Indian Sacred Sites [Clinton]
 Executive Order 13021, 1996, Tribal Colleges and Universities [Clinton]
 Executive Order 13084, 1998, Consultation and Coordination with Indian Tribal Governments [Clinton]
 Executive Order 13096, 1998, American Indian and Alaska Native Education [Clinton]
 Executive Order 13107, 1998, Implementation of Human Rights Treaties [Clinton]
 Executive Order 13158, 2000, Marine Protected Areas [Clinton]
 Executive Order 13175, 2000, Consultation and Coordination with Indian Tribal Governments [Clinton]
 Executive Order 13270, 2002, Tribal College Endorsement [GW Bush]
 Executive Order 13336, 2004, American Indian and Alaska Native Education [GW Bush]

Treaties

The federal government was in charge of relations with the Indians, and the procedure was to use the treaty making power of the president and the Senate to make formal arrangements. Over 200 treaties were agreed upon by 1840.  Gatlin argues that treaties established a procedure that benefited both parties.  The federal government was primarily interested in guaranteeing that Indian lands did not fall into private hands, and that it handled all negotiations with the tribes.  These negotiations, says Gatlin, strengthened the tribes sense of unity and leadership.  The land sales gave the Indians a steady flow of income, and guarantees of federal financial, medical, and educational aid.

Many of the treaties remain in effect and are of special importance regarding federal recognition of tribal status, hunting and fishing rights, rights to protection of sacred properties, rights to water and minerals, and land claims. The federal courts have a long, continuous history of litigation on these issues. The Supreme Court endorsed the procedure, with over 300 decisions making reference to Indian treaties after 1799.

Major treaties
 Treaty of Brownstown, 1808, was between the United States and the Council of Three Fires (Chippewa, Ottawa, Potawatomi), Wyandott, and Shawanoese Indian Nations.
 Treaty of Buffalo Creek
 Treaty of Canandaigua, 1794, is a treaty signed after the American Revolutionary War between the Grand Council of the Six Nations and President George Washington representing the United States of America.
 Treaty of the Cedars
 Cherokee treaties
 1821 Treaty of Chicago
 1833 Treaty of Chicago
 Treaty of Colerain
 Treaty of the Creek Agency (1818)
 Treaty of Cusseta
 Treaty of Dancing Rabbit Creek
 Treaty of Detroit
 Treaty of Doak's Stand
 Treaty of Fond du Lac
 Treaty of Fort Adams
 Fort Bridger Treaty Council of 1868
 Treaty of Fort Clark
 Treaty of Fort Confederation
 Treaty of Fort Finney
 Treaty of Fort Industry
 Treaty of Fort Jackson
 Treaty of Fort Laramie (1851)
 Treaty of Fort Laramie (1868)
 Treaty of Fort Meigs
 Treaty of Fort Pitt
 Treaty of Fort St. Stephens
 Treaty of Fort Stanwix (1784)
 Treaty of Fort Wayne (1803)
 Treaty of Fort Wayne (1809)
 Treaty of Fort Wise
 Georgia resolutions 1827 were a response to the Cherokee’s refusal to cede their territory within the U.S. state of Georgia.
 Treaty of Greenville
 Treaty of Greenville (1814)
 Treaty of Fort Harmar
 Treaty of Hellgate
 Treaty of Hoe Buckintoopa
 Treaty of Holston
 Treaty of Hopewell
 Treaty of Indian Springs (1825)
 Treaty of La Pointe, may refer to either of two treaties made and signed in La Pointe, Wisconsin between the United States and the Ojibwe (Chippewa) Native American peoples. In addition, the Isle Royale Agreement, an adhesion to the first Treaty of La Pointe, was made at La Pointe.
 Treaty of Lewistown
 List of Choctaw treaties
 Little Arkansas Treaty
 Fort Martin Scott Treaty
 Treaty of Fort McIntosh
 Treaty of Medicine Creek
 Medicine Lodge Treaty
 Treaty of Mendota
 Treaty of Moultrie Creek
 Treaty of Mount Dexter
 Native American treaties
 Treaty of New Echota
 Treaty of New York (1790), between the U.S. Government and the Creek Indians.
 Treaty of New York (1796), between New York State and the Seven Nations of Canada.
 Treaty of Old Crossing
 Osage Treaty (1825)
 Treaty of Payne's Landing
 Treaty of Point Elliott
 Treaties of Portage des Sioux
 List of treaties between the Potawatomi and the United States
 Treaty of St. Joseph
 First Treaty of Prairie du Chien
 Second Treaty of Prairie du Chien
 Third Treaty of Prairie du Chien
 Fourth Treaty of Prairie du Chien
 Quinault Treaty
 Treaty of Saginaw
 Treaty of St. Louis (1804)
 Treaty of St. Louis (1816)
 Treaty of St. Louis (1818)
 Treaty of St. Louis (1825)
 Treaty of St. Mary's
 Treaty of St. Peters
 Treaty of Sycamore Shoals
 Treaty of Tellico
 Treaty of Big Tree
 Treaty of Bird's Fort
 Treaty of Grouseland
 Treaty of Mississinewas
 Treaty of Tippecanoe
 Treaty of Traverse des Sioux
 Treaty of Vincennes
 Treaty of Washington City
 Treaty of Washington, with Menominee (1831)
 Treaty with the Kalapuya, etc.
 Walla Walla Council (1855)
 Treaty of Wapakoneta
 Treaty of Washington (1826)
 Treaty of Washington (1836)
 Treaty of Washington (1855)
 Treaty of Watertown, 1776, established a military alliance between the United States and the St. John's and Mi'kmaq First Nations in Nova Scotia against Great Britain during the American Revolutionary War.
 Yankton Treaty

Notable people
The following individuals have played an important role in the evolution of Federal Indian Law and Policy through activism, literature and other methods.
 Hank Adams (Fort Peck Assiniboine-Sioux), Native American rights activist
 James Anaya is the American James J. Lenoir Professor of Human Rights Law and Policy at the University of Arizona's James E. Rogers College of Law.
 Clyde Bellecourt (White Earth Ojibwe), co-founder of American Indian Movement
 Vernon Bellecourt (White Earth Ojibwe), co-founder of American Indian Movement
 Mary Brave Bird (Brulé Lakota), author and activist
 Ed Castillo (Luiseño-Cahuilla), Native American activist who participated in the American Indian occupation of Alcatraz in 1969.
 Ward Churchill, American scholar, author, and political activist.
 Felix S. Cohen, American lawyer and scholar who made a lasting mark on legal philosophy and fundamentally shaped federal Indian law and policy.
 John Collier, American social reformer and Native American advocate.
 Lyda Conley (Wyandot, lawyer and the first woman admitted to the Kansas bar, who fought to retain tribal control of the Wyandot National Burying Ground
 Elizabeth Cook-Lynn (Crow Creek Lakota), editor, essayist, poet, novelist, and academic.
 Lucy Covington (Colville), activist for Native American emancipation.
 Mary Dann and Carrie Dann (Western Shoshone) were spiritual leaders, ranchers, and cultural, spiritual rights and land rights activists.
 Joe DeLaCruz (Quinault), Native American leader in Washington, U.S., president for 22 years of the Quinault Tribe of the Quinault Reservation.
 Vine Deloria, Jr. (Yankton Dakota-Standing Rock Nakota, 1993–2005) was an American Indian author, theologian, historian, and activist.
 Deskaheh (Cayuga, 1873–1925), Haudenosaunee statesman noted for his persistent efforts to get recognition for his people.
 John EchoHawk (Pawnee), Native American attorney, founder of the Native American Rights Fund, and a leading member of the Native American self-determination movement.
 Larry EchoHawk (Pawnee), head of the United States Bureau of Indian Affairs, Attorney General of Idaho from 1991 to 1995.
 Adam Fortunate Eagle (Red Lake Ojibwe), Native American activist and was the principal organizer of the 1969-71 occupation of Alcatraz Island by "Indians of All Tribes."
 Kalyn Free (Choctaw Nation of Oklahoma), American attorney and former political candidate
 Suzan Shown Harjo (Cheyenne–Hodulgee Muscogee) is a policy maker, author, legal activist for American Indian rights, and founder of the Morning Star Institute
 LaDonna Harris (Comanche), activist, founder of Americans for Indian Opportunity, and US vice-presidential candidate.
 Thomasina Jordan (Wampanoag Nation), fought for the federal recognition of Virginian Indian tribes and served as chairwoman of the Virginia Council on Indians.
 Ronnie Lupe (White Mountain Apache), chairman of the White Mountain Apache Tribe, land and water rights, endangered species, and tribal sovereignty activist
 Oren Lyons (Seneca-Onondaga), faithkeeper of the Turtle Clan of the Iroquois Confederacy, Traditional Circle of Indian Elders and Youth, negotiator with national-states on behalf of indigenous nations.
 Janet McCloud (Tulalip), cofounder of Women of All Red Nations (WARN) and Indigenous Women's Network, advocate for fishing and other treaty rights
 D'Arcy McNickle (Salish-Kootenai, 1904–1977), educational reformer, instrumental in drafting the "Declaration of Indian Purpose" for the 1961 American Indian Chicago Conference, co-founder of the National Congress of American Indians
 Wilma Mankiller (Cherokee Nation), community organizer, the first female Principal Chief of the Cherokee Nation.
 Tina Manning (Duck Valley Shoshone-Paiute, d. 1979), water rights activist and wife of John Trudell
 Russell Means (Oglala Lakota, b. 1939), member of AIM, actor
 Carlos Montezuma (Yavapai-Apache), founding member of the Society of American Indians and outspoken opponent of the BIA
 Richard Oakes (activist), Mohawk Native American activist who promoted the fundamental idea that Native peoples have a right to sovereignty, justice, respect and control over their own destinies.
 William Paul (attorney), American attorney, legislator, and political activist from the Tlingit nation of southeastern Alaska.
 Leonard Peltier, activist and member of the American Indian Movement (AIM).
 Simon Pokagon, member of the Pokagon Band of Potawatomi Indians, author, and Native American advocate.
 Robert Robideau, American Indian activist.
 Katherine Siva Saubel, Native American scholar, educator, tribal leader, author, and activist committed to preserving Cahuilla history, culture and language.
 Redbird Smith, Cherokee traditionalist and political activist.
 Standing Bear (Ponca, ca. 1834–1908), chief who successfully argued in US District Court case establishing the right of habeas corpus for Native Americans
 Ralph W. Sturges, American Mohegan tribal chief who helped gain federal recognition for the Mohegan people of Connecticut in 1994.
 JoAnn Tall (Oglala Lakota), environmental and anti-nuclear activist, co-founder of the Native Resource Coalition
 Melissa L. Tatum, Research Professor of Law and Associate Director of the Indigenous Peoples Law and Policy Program at the University of Arizona's James E. Rogers College of Law
 Charlene Teters (Spokane), artist, educator, editor, and founding boardmember of the National Coalition on Racism in Sports and the Media
 Mel Thom (Walker River Paiute), cofounder of National Indian Youth Council and president of the Southwest Regional Indian Youth Council
 Susette LaFlesche Tibbles (Omaha-Ponca-Iowa), author and international lecturer about Native American rights and reservation conditions.
 Thomas Tibbles, journalist and author from Omaha, Nebraska, who became an activist for Native American rights in the United States during the late 19th century and married Susette LaFlesche Tibbles.
 Catherine Troeh (Chinook), editor, co-founder of American Indian Women's Service League and only woman to serve on the Chinook Tribal Council
 John Trudell (Santee Dakota), author, poet, actor, musician, and former chairman of the American Indian Movement.
 Asiba Tupahache, Matinecoc Nation Native American activist from New York.
 Clyde Warrior, activist for Native American civil rights.
 Kevin K. Washburn,  former federal prosecutor, a trial attorney at the U.S. Department of Justice, and the General Counsel of the National Indian Gaming Commission.
 Charmaine White Face (Oglala Lakota), spokesperson for the Teton Sioux Nation Treaty Council and coordinator of the Defenders of the Black Hills, which works toward the Fort Laramie Treaties of 1851 and 1868 being enforced. She works in language preservation, land reclamation, and international indigenous human rights.
 Bernie Whitebear (Colville), American Indian activist, a co-founder of the Seattle Indian Health Board (SIHB), the United Indians of All Tribes Foundation, and the Daybreak Star Cultural Center.
 Robert A. Williams Jr., an American lawyer who is a notable author and legal scholar in the field of Federal Indian Law, International Law and Indigenous Peoples Rights, and Critical Race and Post Colonial Theory.
 Sarah Winnemucca (Northern Paiute, 1844–1891), author and lecturer who educated non-natives about conditions in Indian Country and founded a school for native children
Zitkala-Sa (Gertrude Simmons Bonnin, Yankton Dakota, 1876–1938), political writer and educator, religious freedom activist

Organizations

The following organizations have played an important role in the evolution of Federal Indian Law and Policy through activism, lobbying, government oversight and education.

Government
 Bureau of Indian Affairs
 Bureau of Indian Affairs Police
 Bureau of Indian Education
 Crow Agency, Montana
 Fort Peck Indian Agency
 Indian Peace Commission
 National Indian Gaming Commission
 United States House Natural Resources Subcommittee on Indian and Alaska Native Affairs
 United States Senate Committee on Indian Affairs
 United States Congress Joint Special Committee on Conditions of Indian Tribes

Agencies
Rocky Mountain Region
Blackfeet Agency
Crow Agency
Fort Belknap Agency
Fort Peck Agency
Northern Cheyenne Agency
Rocky Boy's Agency
Wind River Agency

Nations
 Federally recognized tribes
 State-recognized tribes in the United States
 List of Alaska Native tribal entities

Native American advocacy groups and rights organizations

 Alaska Federation of Natives
 Alaska Native Brotherhood/Sisterhood
 American Indian College Fund
 American Indian Defense Association
 American Indian Higher Education Consortium
 American Indian Movement
 American Indian Philosophy Association
 Americans for Indian Opportunity
 Anishinaabe tribal political organizations
 Association on American Indian Affairs
 Cherokee Preservation Foundation
 Cheyenne military societies
 Great Lakes Indian Fish & Wildlife Commission
 Guilford Native American Association
 Indian Health Service
 Indian Rights Association
 Inter-Tribal Environmental Council
 Metrolina Native American Association
 National Congress of American Indians
 National Indian Education Association
 National Indian Youth Council
 Native American Fish and Wildlife Society
 Native American Rights Fund
 North American Indian Center of Boston
 Northern California Indian Development Council
 Original Keetoowah Society
 Phi Sigma Nu
 Algonquian Confederacy of the Quinnipiac Tribal Council
 Sequoyah Research Center
 Society of American Indians
 Tohono O'Odham Ki:Ki Association
 Traditional Circle of Indian Elders & Youth
 Tree of Peace Society
 Tribal College Librarians Institute
 United Indians of All Tribes
 White Earth Land Recovery Project
 Women's National Indian Association

Events and issues
 Aboriginal title in the United States
 Blood quantum laws
 Certificate of Degree of Indian Blood
 Indian termination policy
 Native American self-determination
 Native American civil rights
 Native American Reservation Politics
 Secretarial Review
 Trail of Broken Treaties
 Tribal sovereignty in the United States

Literature
 

 
 
 
 
 
 
 
 Hays, Joel Stanford. "Twisting the Law: Legal Inconsistencies in Andrew Jackson's Treatment of Native-American Sovereignty and State Sovereignty." Journal of Southern Legal History, 21 (no. 1, 2013), 157–92.
 
 
 Morris, Lisa. (2015). Dying in Indian Country. Sisters, OR: Deep River Books. .

 
 Prucha, Francis Paul, ed. Documents of United States Indian Policy (3rd ed. 2000)
 Prucha, Francis Paul. American Indian Treaties: The History of a Political Anomaly (1997)  excerpt and text search
 Prucha, Francis Paul. The Great Father: The United States Government and the American Indians (abridged edition, 1986)
 
 Scofield, Ruth Packwood. (1992). Behind the Buckskin Curtain. New York: Carlton Press, Inc. 

 
 Blood Struggle highlights major events and consequences in American Indian history since the Termination Act of 1953.
 
 
 
Robert J. McCarthy, The Bureau of Indian Affairs and the Federal Trust Obligation to American Indians, 19 BYU J. PUB. L. 1 (December, 2004).

See also

Native Energy
Pan-Indianism
Tribal colleges and universities
Tribal Council

Notes

External links

American Indian Policy Center
National Congress of American Indians
Tribal Court Clearinghouse, Tribal Law and Policy Institute
US Department of Justice: Native American Policies

United States law-related lists
Native American law
Native American-related lists
 1
Legislation concerning indigenous peoples
United States federal Indian law and policy